The perivitelline space is the space between the zona pellucida and the cell membrane of an oocyte or fertilized ovum. In the slow block to polyspermy, the cortical granules released from the ovum are deposited in the perivitelline space. Polysaccharides released in the granules cause the space to swell, pushing the zona pellucida farther from the oocyte. The hydrolytic enzymes released by the granules cause the zona reaction, which removes the ZP3 ligands from the zona pellucida.

Clinical importance
Clinically, the perivitelline space is relevant because it is where the polar body lodges after meiosis.

References

External links

Mammal female reproductive system
Germ cell structures
Cloning